Chalindrey is a commune in the Haute-Marne department in north-eastern France. Culmont-Chalindrey station is an important railway junction.

Population

See also
Communes of the Haute-Marne department

References

Communes of Haute-Marne